WZOO (700 kHz) is an oldies, classic hits, and classic top 40 formatted broadcast radio station licensed to Asheboro, North Carolina, serving the Piedmont Triad.  WZOO is owned and operated by RCR of Randolph County, Ltd.

WZOO is not connected in any way with WZOO-FM, an FM radio station in Edgewood, Ohio sharing the same callsign.

Translators
In addition to the main station, WZOO is relayed by two FM translators to widen its broadcast area.

References

External links
99.9FM The Zoo Online

1971 establishments in North Carolina
Classic hits radio stations in the United States
Oldies radio stations in the United States
Radio stations established in 1971
ZOO
ZOO